Karel David (born 8 February 1964 in Nový Jičín, Czechoslovakia) is a retired long-distance runner from the Czech Republic, who won the 1991 and 1992 edition of the Vienna Marathon. David represented Czechoslovakia twice in the men's marathon (1988 and 1992) at the Summer Olympics. He set his personal best time (2:11:57) on 23 May 1993 at the Hamburg Marathon.

Achievements

References

1991 Marathon Year Rankings

1964 births
Living people
Czech male long-distance runners
Athletes (track and field) at the 1988 Summer Olympics
Athletes (track and field) at the 1992 Summer Olympics
Olympic athletes of Czechoslovakia
Sportspeople from Nový Jičín